Taiwan Mobile is a mobile phone operator based in Taiwan. It is the second largest telecom company behind Chunghwa Telecom.

History
Taiwan Mobile started as part of a strategic divestment from the now defunct Pacific Electric Wire & Cable Co. Ltd (listed then in Taiwan's main board of securities). PEWC started their telecom venture first by becoming a shareholder (5%) of Iridium LLC in 1994, and this investment place them in a high profile, and high risk, following a strategic win in Hong Kong PCS license in 1995 and later rolled out as P Plus Communications in Hong Kong. PEWC also made various business development efforts and tender bids in different wireless licenses in China, Vietnam, Singapore, Indonesia and Philippines. The company finally returned to Taiwan to bid for the various licenses being liberalised in 1996 and 1997.

Taiwan Mobile was previously named Pacific Cellular Corporation (太平洋電信事業股份有限公司; PCC) while the Hong Kong investment holding company was called PEWC Telecommunications Co. Ltd which holds the investment in P-Plus Communications Ltd. PEWC, PCC, Pacific Iridium were part of the overall telecom portfolio. The company had also invested into various telecom and internet businesses and had made a series of merger and acquisitions with retail distribution company, a CRM company and an engineering company that  receives outsourcing contract from the combined cellular and phone companies.

Today's Taiwan Mobile's logo is more colorful but still has the look of the original satellite gateway station of Iridium with hexagonal shapes. The older logo used to be all red and had a legacy red from the now defunct Pacific Electric Wire & Cable Co., Ltd (太平洋電線電纜股份有限公司; PEWC).

Mobile Network Information

See also
 List of companies of Taiwan
 Chunghwa Telecom
 Far EasTone
 Taiwan Star Telecom

References

External links

Companies listed on the Taiwan Stock Exchange
Mobile phone companies of Taiwan
Telecommunications companies of Taiwan
Companies based in Taipei
Taiwanese brands
Telecommunications companies established in 1997
1997 establishments in Taiwan